Du Zeng (died 319) was a Chinese military general and rebel of the Jin dynasty (266–420). In 312, he joined his fellow general, Hu Kang (胡亢), in rebelling against Jin from Jingling Commandery (竟陵, roughly modern Jingmen, Hubei), but later killed him and assumed leadership of the rebellion. Du Zeng, along with another rebel leader, Du Tao, became a persistent threat to Jin in the south as he caused trouble in Jingzhou and Xiangzhou (湘州; in modern Hunan). Eventually, he was decisively defeated by the general, Zhou Fang in 317, before being captured and executed in 319.

As subordinate of Sima Xin and Hu Kang 
Du Zeng was from Xinye County in Nanyang Commandary and started his career under the Prince of Xinye, Sima Xin (司馬歆). Du Zeng was said to be a very strong man, being able to swim across a river while wearing armor. Under Sima Xin, he rose to the rank of Colonel of the Southern Man Tribes and was present wherever Sima Xin went up to his death at the hands of Zhang Chang in 303. 

In 312, in light of the Disaster of Yongjia, Hu Kang, another general of Sima Xin, took the opportunity to gather men at Jingling Commandery and start a rebellion, declaring himself Duke of Chu. Du Zeng joined Hu Kang and became his provisional Administrator of Jingling. However, Hu Kang proved to be a problematic leader due to his paranoia that made him execute many of his generals. Du Zeng plotted to get rid of him, but feigned loyalty at first to gain his trust. Later that year, Du Zeng supported Hu Kang's decision to campaign against the bandit Wang Chong (王沖). Du Zeng had artisans to tamper with Hu Kang's personal guards' weapons before secretly enticing Wang Chong to attack. Hu Kang sent out all his men against Wang Chong, leaving himself defenceless within the city. Du Zeng assassinated him and declared himself General of the Household Gentlemen and acting Administrator of Jingling.

Leading the rebellion 
Du Zeng's first objective was to enter an alliance with the Administrator of Nan Commandary, Liu Wu (劉務). After Liu Wu refused to marry Du Zeng's daughter, Du Zeng had him killed. Later, the Jin general Tao Kan's subordinate, Wang Gong (王貢) forged an order seemingly from his superior appointing Du Zeng as Grand Commander of the Vanguard. Wang Gong then killed Wang Chong and received Du Zeng's surrender. However, Du Zeng refused to answer a summoning from Tao Kan, which caused Wang Gong to panic. Fearing punishment, Wang Gong joined with Du Zeng and attacked Tao Kan, greatly routing him to the point that Tao Kan was demoted to a commoner for a brief while.

In 314, Du Zeng sent his general Wang Zhen (王眞) to attack Tao Kan at Linzhang (林障, in present-day Hanyang District, Hubei). Tao was defeated and retreated to Shezhong (灄中, in present-day Pujiang County, Zhejiang) but when reinforcements from Zhou Fang arrived, they drove Wang Zhen back. The following year, Emperor Min of Jin sent Diwu Yi (第五猗) to Jingzhou, so Du Zeng welcomed him and made diplomatic ties by marrying his nephew to Diwu's daughter. Together, they occupied the area around the Han River.

The same year, Tao Kan had defeated the powerful rebel Du Tao, and he set his target to defeating Du Zeng as well. Tao Kan attacked Du Zeng at Shicheng despite warnings from his Marshal Lu Tian (魯恬). Du Zeng once again defeated Tao Kan with his cavalries. After the battle, Du Zeng's generals gathered at Shunyang (尋陽, in present-day Xunyang, Jiangxi) where they saluted Tao Kan before leaving. Du Zeng then attacked Xun Song (荀崧) at Wancheng to follow up his victory but through the heroics of Xun Song's 12-year-old daughter, Xun Guan, Zhou Fang arrived with reinforcements, forcing Du Zeng to lift the siege. Later, Du Zeng pretended to ask Xun Song for permission to clear bandits around Dan River. Despite Tao Kan's warning, Xun Song allowed him. Du Zeng attacked Jin in Xiangyang instead, but was repelled.

Wang Yi replaced Tao Kan in campaigning against Du Zeng later that year. Many of Tao Kan's generals were unhappy because of this and defected to Du Zeng. Together, they defeated Wang Yi on numerous occasions. In 317, the Jin commander, Wang Dun sent Zhao You (趙誘) and Zhu Gui (朱軌) to help Wang Yi. Tao Kan's former generals were considering surrender at this point, a sentiment shared by Du Zeng. Thus, Du Zeng pledged to Wang Yi that he would defeat Diwu Yi to clear his name. However, after killing Diwu Yi, he later went to Yangkou (揚口, in present-day Qianjiang, Hubei) and placed Wang Yi under siege. Zhao You and Zhu Gui fought Du Zeng at Lake Nüguan (女觀, in present-day Zhicheng, Hubei) but the two were killed in battle. Du Zeng pressed on to Miankou (沔口, in present-day Hankou, Hubei), so Sima Rui responded by sending Zhou Fang to deal with him.

Zhou Fang and Du Zeng faced each other at Dunyang (沌阳, in present-day Wuhan, Hubei). Du Zeng focused on destroying Zhou's left and right wing, but despite his success in doing so, Zhou Fang was able to maintain his army's morale. By noon, both of Zhou Fang's army's wings had collapsed. Du Zeng then approached the centre when suddenly, Zhou Fang and his men started beating their drums. 800 of Zhou Fang's elite troops violently charged into Du Zeng's lines, killing and scattering them by the thousands. Zhou Fang pursued Du Zeng through the night until they reached Wudang, where Du Zeng held out for the next two years.

In 319, Du Zeng was caught in a surprise attack by Zhou Fang, causing chaos among Du Zeng's men. Overwhelmed, Du Zeng's generals arrested him and gave themselves up to Zhou Fang. Zhou Fang initially wanted to spare him as a prisoner but Zhao You and Zhu Gui's children, Zhao Yin (趙胤) and Zhu Chang (朱昌), wanted to avenge their fathers. Zhou Fang permitted them, so Du Zeng was beheaded. His body was later chopped up and consumed by Zhao Yin and Zhu Chang.

References 

 Fang, Xuanling (ed.) (648). Book of Jin (Jin Shu).
 Sima, Guang (1084). Zizhi Tongjian.

319 deaths
Jin dynasty (266–420) rebels
Jin dynasty (266–420) generals
Executed Jin dynasty (266–420) people